
Year 511 (DXI) was a common year starting on Saturday (link will display the full calendar) of the Julian calendar. At the time, it was known as the Year of the Consulship of Felix and Secundinus (or, less frequently, year 1264 Ab urbe condita). The denomination 511 for this year has been used since the early medieval period, when the Anno Domini calendar era became the prevalent method in Europe for naming years.

Events 
 By place 
 Byzantine Empire 
 Riots erupt in the streets of Antioch, between supporters of Patriarch Flavian II and Emperor Anastasius I, in sympathy with Non-Chalcedonianism.

 Europe 
 November 27 – King Clovis I dies at Paris (Lutetia) at age 45, and is buried in the Abbey of St. Genevieve. The Merovingian Dynasty is continued by his four sons (Theuderic I, Chlodomer, Childebert I and Chlothar I), who divide the Frankish Kingdom and rule from the capitals at Metz, Orléans, Paris and Soissons, respectively.
 Ostrogothic King Theodoric the Great assumes the regency over Amalaric, his grandson and future king of the Visigothic Kingdom (approximate date) - Theodoric now rules over territory stretching from the Atlantic Ocean to the Adriatic Sea.

 By topic 
 Inventions 
 Aryabhata, Indian astronomer and mathematician,  comes up with concepts of mathematical equations, one of which explains the rotation of the Earth on its axis. This concept is far ahead of its time and he is fairly accurate in his description of it. He also comes up with a lot of other ideas about the Solar System, but many of them are flawed because he considers the Earth to be the center of the universe. Aryabhata is often given credit for coming up with the number zero and using it as a placeholder.

 Religion 
 First Council of Orléans: Clovis I convenes a synod of Gallic bishops to reform the Church, and create a link between the Crown and the Catholic episcopate. 
 Macedonius II is deposed as patriarch of Constantinople, and replaced by Timothy I.
 The convent of Saint-Césaire is built in Arles.

Births 
 Yang Yin, official of Northern Qi (d. 560)

Deaths 
 November 27 – Clovis I, king of the Franks

References